Lise Ringheim (15 May 1926 – 25 September 1994) was a Danish film actress. She appeared in 37 films between 1943 and 1993. She was born in Frederiksberg, Denmark and died in Denmark.

Selected filmography
 Vi arme syndere (1952)
 We Who Go the Kitchen Route (1953)
 Sunstroke (1953)
 The Last Winter (1960)
 Harry and the Butler (1961)
 Svinedrengen og prinsessen på ærten (1962)
 Den kære familie (1962)
 Dreaming of Rita (1993)

External links

1926 births
1994 deaths
Danish film actresses
Best Actress Bodil Award winners
People from Frederiksberg
20th-century Danish actresses